In the Battle of Usagre on 25 May 1811, Anglo-Allied cavalry commanded by Major-General William Lumley routed a French cavalry force led by Major-General Marie Victor Latour-Maubourg at the village of Usagre in the Peninsular War.

Background
A week after the very bloody Battle of Albuera, Marshal Nicolas Soult sent Latour-Maubourg's cavalry to discover the position of Marshal William Carr Beresford's Allied army. On 25 May, the French cavalry came upon a line of Portuguese cavalry vedettes on a ridge behind the village of Usagre. Lumley posted the bulk of his forces behind the ridge, out of sight.

Forces
Lumley force included Colonel George de Grey's brigade (3rd Prince of Wales Dragoon Guards, 4th Queen's Own Dragoons), the 13th Light Dragoons under Lieutenant-Colonel Joseph Muter, Portuguese cavalry under Colonel Loftus William Otway (1st and 7th Dragoons, plus elements of the 5th and 8th) and some Spanish cavalry led by Penne Villemur. There were 980 British, 1,000 Portuguese and 300 Spanish troopers present, plus Lefebvre's Troop, Royal Horse Artillery.

Latour-Maubourg led two dragoon brigades under Brigadier-General Bron (4th, 20th and 26th Dragoons) and Brigadier-General Bouvier des Éclaz (14th, 17th and 27th Dragoons). He sent four regiments of light cavalry under Brigadier-General Briche on a wide flanking manoeuvre. The French had about 3,500 horsemen. Confident in his numerical superiority, Latour-Maubourg pressed ahead.

Battle
Lumley ignored the French flanking force because he knew that they would not arrive in time. He let the 4th and 20th Dragoons of Bron's brigade pass through Usagre, cross the bridge and form up on the other side. As the 26th Dragoons began crossing the span, Lumley attacked. He brought up his cavalry and sent six British squadrons, supported by six Portuguese squadrons on their right, against the two deployed French regiments.

The French horsemen were defeated and thrown back on the 26th Dragoons, who were still jammed on the bridge. With the British cavalry all around them and their retreat blocked, the French dragoons were cut to pieces. Latour-Maubourg's only recourse was to dismount the first regiment of Bouvier des Eclat's brigade and use the dragoons to hold the houses near the bridge. At last, the remnants of Bron's regiments fought their way back, covered by carbine fire from the village.

Results
The French lost 250 killed or wounded, plus 78 captured, mostly from the 4th and 20th Dragoons. The British only lost 20 troopers killed or wounded.

Notes

References
 
 ;

Further reading

External links
 

Battles of the Peninsular War
Battles of the Napoleonic Wars
Battles involving the United Kingdom
Battles involving France
Battles involving Portugal
Battle of Usagre
Battle of Usagre
May 1811 events